Nothobranchius luekei is a species of killifish in the family Nothobranchiidae. It is endemic to Tanzania.  Its natural habitat is temporary pools. Its specific name honours the German aquarist Karl Heinz Lüke who was the first person to breed this species in an aquarium.

References

luekei
Fish of Tanzania
Endemic fauna of Tanzania
Taxonomy articles created by Polbot
Fish described in 1984
Taxa named by Lothar Seegers